This list of Panama-flagged cargo ships consists of vessels which are registered in Panama and subject to the laws of that country. Panama is the world's most prolific flag state by both tonnage and number of ships; over 8,065 ships accounting for almost 23% of the world's DWT fly the Panamanian flag, largely due to its status as a flag of convenience. A total of 4,721 bulk carriers, container ships, and general cargo ships flew the Panamanian flag in 2021. Any ship which flew the flag at any point in its career, and is present in the encyclopedia, is listed here.

List of ships

References 

Panama
~